Appetizer Mobile is a mobile application development firm based in New York City, New York. Established in 2009, the company has gained recognition for its work with many well-known celebrities in the entertainment industry including Universal Music Group, the NBA, and Interscope Records. Appetizer Mobile is a creative mobile application development, consulting and marketing company. The company specializes in mobile application development across all major platforms including Apple iOS (iPhone, iPad), Android (Phone and Tablets), BlackBerry OS (10 and Legacy) and Windows Phone.

History 
Created by founder and CEO Jordan Edelson, Appetizer Mobile offers mobile application development, consulting, and marketing services since 2009. Joined by Ian Deschler (Chief Communications Officer), and Jack Wenarsky (Chief Strategic Planning Officer), Appetizer Mobile has accrued a clientele composed of Fortune 500 companies and leading figures in entertainment.

In 2011, Appetizer Mobile partnered with Interscope Records and pop singer Lady Gaga to create the official “Lady Gaga: The Monster In You” mobile application. Since then, Appetizer Mobile has developed mobile applications that have been featured in national advertising campaigns by Apple, and has been named one of the Top 10 Mobile App Developer in the United States.

Mobile applications developed by Appetizer Mobile have been featured in two of Apple’s nationwide TV commercials: “Intro to Math” was featured in the "We Believe" iPad 2 commercial, and “Intro to Letters” was featured in the Apple iPad commercial, "iPad is Electric."

The “Intro To Letters” application was also featured in Apple's 2013 nationwide billboard campaign that included New York, San Francisco, Minneapolis and more. The company has also had featured apps preloaded as "Demo Apps" on model iPhone 4S's in Apple retail stores worldwide.

Major clients 
 Joe Girardi
 Montessorium
 Interscope Records
 NBA
 Steinway & Sons
 Sony Music
 Universal Music Group
 MBM Records
 Epic Records
 Del Frisco's Double Eagle Steak House
 Sullivans Steakhouse
 Zoc Doc
 Lady Gaga
 50 Cent
 Kim Kardashian
 City Jet

See also
 Tech companies in the New York metropolitan area

References

External links 
Official Website

Software companies based in New York City
Software companies of the United States